The Motorola 68008 is an 8/32-bit microprocessor introduced by Motorola in 1982. It is a version of 1979's Motorola 68000 with an 8-bit external data bus, as well as a smaller address bus. The 68008 was available with 20 or 22 address lines (respective to 48-pin or 52-pin package) which allowed 1 MB or 4 MB address space versus the 16 MB addressable on the 68000. The 68008 was designed to work with lower cost and simpler 8-bit memory systems. Because of its smaller data bus, it was roughly half as fast as a 68000 of the same clock speed. It was still faster than competing 8-bit microprocessors, because internally the 68008 behaves identically to the 68000 and has the same microarchitecture.

Motorola ended production of the 68008 in 1996.

Details
There are two versions of the chip. The original is in a 48-pin dual in-line package with a 20-bit address bus, allowing it to use up to 1 megabyte of memory. A later version is in a 52-pin plastic leaded chip carrier; this version has a 22-bit address bus and can support  of RAM.

Usages
The Sinclair QL microcomputer and Luxor ABC 1600 use the 68008 as their main processor.

References

External links 
 A small 68008 design
 Kiwi - an 68k Homebrew Computer

68k microprocessors